The 2002–03 Cypriot Second Division was the 48th season of the Cypriot second-level football league. Anagennisi Deryneia won their 2nd title.

Format
Fourteen teams participated in the 2002–03 Cypriot Second Division. All teams played against each other twice, once at their home and once away. The team with the most points at the end of the season crowned champions. The first three teams were promoted to 2003–04 Cypriot First Division and the last three teams were relegated to the 2003–04 Cypriot Third Division.

Changes from previous season
Teams promoted to 2002–03 Cypriot First Division
 Nea Salamina
 Digenis Morphou
 Aris Limassol

Teams relegated from 2001–02 Cypriot First Division
 Ethnikos Assia
 Doxa Katokopias
 Ermis Aradippou

Teams promoted from 2001–02 Cypriot Third Division
 SEK Agiou Athanasiou
 Ayia Napa
 AEK/Achilleas Ayiou Theraponta

Teams relegated to 2002–03 Cypriot Third Division
 Omonia Aradippou
 AEZ Zakakiou
 Adonis Idaliou

League standings

Results

See also
 Cypriot Second Division
 2002–03 Cypriot First Division
 2002–03 Cypriot Cup

Sources

Cypriot Second Division seasons
Cyprus
2002–03 in Cypriot football